The Delano Unified Elementary School District is in Delano, California. Of the 11 schools, eight of the schools are K-5. They are Princeton, Morningside, Harvest, Fremont, Terrace, Albany Park, Nuevea Vista and Del Vista. The other 3 serve 6th-8th grade. They include Cecil Ave., Almond Tree, and La Vina. The oldest, Cecil Ave. was once an Elementary School and is currently located across from the city's first High School DHS (Delano High School).

References

External links

School districts in California